The 2019 Nordic Naturals Challenger was a professional tennis tournament played on hard courts. It was the 32nd edition of the tournament which was part of the 2019 ATP Challenger Tour. It took place in Aptos, United States between 5 and 11 August 2019.

Singles main-draw entrants

Seeds

 1 Rankings are as of July 29, 2019.

Other entrants
The following players received wildcards into the singles main draw:
  Jenson Brooksby
  Ryan Harrison
  Brandon Holt
  Sam Riffice
  Donald Young

The following players received entry into the singles main draw as alternates:
  Dennis Novikov
  Michael Redlicki
  Alexander Sarkissian

The following players received entry into the singles main draw using their ITF World Tennis Ranking:
  Maxime Cressy
  Lloyd Glasspool
  Evan Hoyt
  Martin Redlicki
  Tim van Rijthoven

The following players received entry from the qualifying draw:
  Keegan Smith
  Volodymyr Uzhylovskyi

The following player received entry as a lucky loser:
  Sem Verbeek

Champions

Singles

  Steve Johnson def.  Dominik Köpfer 6–4, 7–6(7–4).

Doubles

  Marcelo Arévalo /  Miguel Ángel Reyes-Varela def.  Nathan Pasha /  Max Schnur 5–7, 6–3, [10–8].

References

2019 ATP Challenger Tour
2019
2019 in American tennis
2019 in sports in California
August 2019 sports events in the United States